Castnia eudesmia is a moth in the Castniidae family. It is found in Chile.

References

Moths described in 1838
Castniidae
Endemic fauna of Chile